The 2023 Davis Cup World Group I Play-offs were held from 3 to 5 February 2023. The twelve winners of this round qualified for the 2023 Davis Cup World Group I while the twelve losers qualified for the 2023 Davis Cup World Group II.

Teams
Twenty-four teams will play for twelve spots in the World Group I, in series decided on a home and away basis.

These twenty-four teams are:
 12 losing teams from World Group I.
 12 winning teams from World Group II.

The 12 winning teams from the play-offs will qualify for the World Group I and the 12 losing teams will qualify for the World Group II.

#: Nations Ranking as of 28 November 2022.

Qualified teams

  (#20)
  (#23)
  (#25)
  (#26)
  (#32)
  (#34)
  (#35)
  (#36)
  (#37)
  (#38)
  (#39)
  (#41)

  (#43)
  (#44)
  (#45)
  (#47)
  (#48)
  (#49)
  (#51)
  (#55)
  (#56)
  (#63)
  (#70)
  (#72)

Results summary

Results

Japan vs. Poland

Greece vs. Ecuador

Brazil vs. China

Denmark vs. India

Thailand vs. Romania

Latvia vs. Israel

Peru vs. Ireland

Mexico vs. Chinese Taipei

Ukraine vs. Lebanon

Turkey vs. Slovenia

Lithuania vs. Pakistan

New Zealand vs. Bulgaria

References

External links
Draw

World Group